Heng Siew Chiang Sdn. Bhd. is a Malaysian company headquartered in Tawau, Malaysia. The company's business operations include local wholesale and retail trade of foodstuffs and household supplies, international trade of agricultural commodities, currency exchange and plantations.

History

1950–89: Founding and incorporation
The company was founded in the 1950s by the late Heng Siew Chiang (1918–1978) in Tawau, North Borneo as his business venture in the Nanyang region after immigrating from the Sultanate of Bulungan, Indonesia and emigrating from Chaoyang, China. Established as "Chop Heng Siew Chiang", it had its beginnings as a modest import-export trading house and grocery shop on the Dunlop Street and later on the Belian Street, based mainly on household supplies and agro-food products.

Following the formation of Malaysia, the corporation was renamed "Kedai Heng Siew Chiang" (Malay for Heng Siew Chiang's Shop) before becoming today's incorporated "Heng Siew Chiang Sdn. Bhd." or "王受長有限公司" in its Chinese name since 1977.

1990–present: Change of managing director and expansions
Heng Tiang Shin, fourth son from the founder's first wife, took the reins of the family business in the early 1990s as the managing director, and has expanded the company's business segments in shipping and plantations. Having qualified in the UK since 1983, he was admitted as an Associate Member of the Association of Chartered Certified Accountants (ACCA) in 1986 and became Fellow Member in 1991. He is currently a member of the Malaysian Institute of Accountants (MIA).

Lawsuits and disputes
The company had been involved in a number of legal disputes.

Most notably, it came to public attention when it sued the Malaysian Government in the High Court after officers from the Control of Paddy and Rice Section seized an HSC rice transshipment cargo in 2006 on grounds of bringing it into Malaysia without import licence. The Malaysian Government won the case on 20 October 2009 and the presiding judge ruled that the company imported rice from Vietnam without licence and was in violation of the Control of Padi and Rice Act 1994.

However, the High Court ruling was eventually overturned by the Court of Appeal and was set aside with damages on 6 August 2012. Dato' Mohd Hishamudin Mohd Yunus, Dato' Alizatul Khair binti Osman Khairuddin and Datuk Lim Yee Lan unanimously allowed the company's appeal and decided that the seizure of the HSC rice cargo by the Malaysian Government was unlawful as it was not meant for importation into Malaysia from Vietnam, but transshipment at Malaysia from Vietnam to the Philippines and Indonesia.

References

External links 
Facebook, official corporate site

1950 establishments in North Borneo
Privately held companies of Malaysia